The Martín Fierro Awards is the name of the most prominent awards for Argentine radio and television, granted by APTRA, the Association of Argentine Television and Radio Journalists.

History
The awards were first given in 1959, limited to television. The next year, the awards adopted their current name, after José Hernández' epic poem Martín Fierro (considered by some as the national epic of Argentina). When the award began, the sole television station in the country was Channel 7. As the media outlets grew, the awards expanded to incorporate media from throughout the country. In 1967, radio productions were included in the awards for the first time. Nowadays there is a special rotating venue, honoring the winners from all the Provinces.

Because of the censorship and persecution of artists carried over during the 1976-83 military dictatorship, the membership of APTRA dwindled and the awards were suspended. It was not until 1988 that the award was revived. In 2004, the voting became computerized to make it both more secure and simpler, as well as allowing voting to take place immediately before broadcasting.

Inaugural awards
The first year the awards were given, 1959, the ceremony took place at the Cervantes National Theater and the inductees included:
 
Best actress: Myriam de Urquijo (La vida de los otros)
Best actor: Pedro López Lagar (Teatro de Arthur Miller)
Best suspense: Luís Medina Castro (Historia de jóvenes)
Best comedian: Dringue Farías (La familia Gesa se divierte)
Best comic actress Olinda Bozán (El show de Pablo Palitos)
Best soap opera: Historia de jóvenes
Best news program: Sala de periodistas
Best entertainment program: Cabalgata Gillette hasta el infinito
Best coordinator: Orlando Marconi (Cinemaspesos)
Best male announcer: Adolfo Salinas
Best female announcer: Nelly Trenti
Best trap: Alén "we can say the surname"
Stage direction: Narciso Ibáñez Menta

Special awards

In 1991 APTRA created a special award, the Golden Martín Fierro award. It is given to a single person or production in the annual ceremony, and it is intended as a prize to trajectory or to outstanding quality. The first winner was the host show "Fax", and the most recent one the TV series 100 días para enamorarse. A second main prize, the Platinum Martín Fierro Award, was added in 2009, per the 50th anniversary of APTRA. The first winner of it was Mirtha Legrand.

See also
 Latin American television awards

References

External links 

Archived official website
Winners of the 50th edition, 2021/2022
IMDb

Argentine culture
Mass media in Argentina
Argentine television awards
1959 establishments in Argentina